The following television stations operate on virtual channel 10 in Mexico:

Regional networks
Canal 10 Chiapas in the state of Chiapas
TV Mar in Baja California Sur and Puerto Vallarta, Jalisco
Tlaxcala Televisión in the state of Tlaxcala

Local stations
XHMEE-TDT in Mexicali, Baja California
XHJUB-TDT (Nu9ve subchannel) in Ciudad Juárez, Chihuahua
XHTSCO-TDT in Saltillo, Coahuila
XHA-TDT in Durango, Durango
XHQMGU-TDT in Guadalajara, Jalisco
XHTPG-TDT in Tepic, Nayarit
XHSECE-TDT in Querétaro, Querétaro
XHCOSL-TDT in Matehuala, San Luis Potosí
XHSLV-TDT in San Luis Potosí, San Luis Potosí
XHQ-TDT in Culiacán, Sinaloa
XHMZ-TDT in Mazatlán, Sinaloa
XHI-TDT in Ciudad Obregón, Sonora
XHFW-TDT in Tampico, Tamaulipas

References

10 virtual